Robert G. Henderson is an American retired sound editor. He got his start on the TV series Hogan's Heroes.

Oscar Nominations
Both of these are in Best Sound Editing.

1985 Academy Awards-Nominated for Ladyhawke. Nomination shared with Alan Robert Murray. Lost to Back to the Future.
1989 Academy Awards-Nominated for Lethal Weapon 2. Nomination shared with Alan Robert Murray. Lost to Indiana Jones and the Last Crusade.

Selected filmography

Executive Decision (1996)
The Fan (1996)
Assassins (1995)
Bad Boys (1995)
Maverick (1994)
Demolition Man (1993)
True Romance (1993)
Lethal Weapon 3 (1992)
Passenger 57 (1992)
Radio Flyer (1992)
The Last Boy Scout (1991)
New Jack City (1991)
Die Hard 2 (1990)
Hard to Kill (1990)
The Rookie (1990)
Lethal Weapon 2 (1989)
Pink Cadillac (1989)
Bird (1988)
The Dead Pool (1988)
Scrooged (1988)
Fatal Attraction (1987)
Lethal Weapon (1987)
Heartbreak Ridge (1986)
Ladyhawke (1985)
Pale Rider (1985)
National Lampoon's Vacation (1983)
Sudden Impact (1983)
Firefox (1982)

References

External links

American sound editors
Living people
Date of birth missing (living people)
Year of birth missing (living people)